Based on a True Story… is the eighth studio album by American country music artist Blake Shelton. It was released on March 26, 2013, through Warner Bros. Records and debuted at #3 with a career best for Shelton at nearly 200,000 sold.  The album became the ninth best-selling album of 2013 in the US, earning Shelton a Platinum certification by the RIAA on September 30, 2013. In 2016, Based on a True Story… was certified double-platinum by the RIAA.

Content
"Grandaddy's Gun" was previously recorded by Rhett Akins on the 2010 album, Michael Waddell's Bone Collector: The Brotherhood Album and by Staind singer Aaron Lewis on his 2012 debut country album, The Road. Lewis's version was released as a single to country radio in 2013 and peaked at No. 46 on the Billboard Country Airplay chart.

Critical reception

Based on a True Story… received mixed reviews from critics. At Metacritic, a website which assigns a normalised rating out of 100 from reviews by mainstream critics, it holds a rating of 64 based on 5 reviews. Joseph Hudak of Country Weekly thought that some of the songs "feel rushed, as if The Voice coach hurriedly picked songs to record in Nashville before he had to catch his flight back to L.A." He praised "I Still Got a Finger", "Ten Times Crazier", "Mine Would Be You", and "Granddaddy's Gun" as the strongest tracks on the album, saying of those songs that "Blake excels and the avowed smart aleck is found with his heart on his denim sleeve." AllMusic's Stephen Thomas Erlewine found that "the very sense that more is more is essential to the appeal of Based on a True Story...: every song is bigger, brighter, bolder than the next, super-sized country for a super-sized time" and this is not good because "there's just a little bit too much of the schtick; individually the cuts work fine but they overwhelm not only the gentler moments...cancel[ing] each other out over the long run." Sarah Rodman of The Boston Globe gave a mixed review to the album, when she alluded that "Much of it is perfectly acceptable. All of it is executed competently", yet Rodman called the lone highlight the "dusty story song" of "Granddaddy's Gun". In addition, Rodman noted that the album "doesn't offer enough personal touches to distinguish it from a lot of other tales coming out of Nashville." At Entertainment Weekly, Melissa Maerz signaled that Shelton is "just not a gravitas kind of guy, and the outdated production only makes it harder to take his songs seriously, especially with the talk-box-style guitar effects and the ill-advised use of AutoTune."

Conversely, Jerry Shriver of USA Today affirmed that the album comes from a place where Shelton's comments about the industry, which he noted that the effort "puts that very legitimate argument into a fuller and highly entertaining context", and found that "the music will always be about blue-jeaned babes in the full moonlight, dirt roads, [and] small towns". Roughstock's Matt Bjorke praised the album as "a strong, current record with a couple of moments that demand repeated attention." Gary Graff of The Oakland Press evoked how Shelton "make[s] it clear that despite the mass-media notoriety Shelton still considers himself a proud country boy — declaring his beer-drinkin', tobacco-chewin' 'redneck' loyalties" on the album. Taste of Country's Billy Dukes alluded to how this "isn’t an album that impresses with a single listen" because it has "sizzle, and not in that ironic 'bow-chicka-wow-wow' sort of way that’s occasionally implied with this singer’s sense of humor", and Dukes noted that "The emotion is easy to overlook on a single pass, but second or third listens find a collection of songs that really stick to the soul." Got Country Online's Phyllis Hunter found that it was "obvious that [the songs] were carefully chosen to give a personal glimpse into what is a very public life", which she heaped praise on the album by stating "Kudos, Mr. Shelton, kudos…", and affirmed that Shelton has "done all of these songwriters quite proud." Mikael Wood of the Los Angeles Times told that "With its easy rhymes and hummable choruses, the album doesn't ask the listener to work any harder than Shelton himself is prepared to work", which Wood evoked that "if Shelton's investment in his material here seems about as minimal as possible, it's a testament to his considerable charm", and this allowed Wood to perceive that it "never feels like a con." Wood concluded with noting that with respect to Shelton's music "it's not the journey that matters, but the destination."

Commercial performance
The album debuted at No.1 on the Top Country Albums chart and No. 3 on the Billboard 200, selling 199,000 copies for the week.  The album became the ninth best-selling album of 2013 in the United States, with 1,109,000 copies sold for the year. As of March 2015, the album has sold a total of 1.46 million copies in the United States. In 2016, it was certified double-platinum with sales of 2,000,000 units.

Track listing

Personnel
Vocals

 Rhett Akins – backing vocals
 Rodney Clawson – backing vocals
 Perry Coleman – backing vocals
 Dallas Davidson – backing vocals
 Scott Hendricks – backing vocals

 Wes Hightower – backing vocals
 RaeLynn – backing vocals
 Pistol Annies – backing vocals on "Boys 'Round Here"
 Gwen Sebastian – backing vocals on "My Eyes"
 Blake Shelton – lead vocals

Musicians

 Tom Bukovac – electric guitar 
 Paul Franklin – pedal steel guitar 
 Tommy Harden – drum loops 
 Aubrey Haynie – fiddle
 Charlie Judge – synthesizers, Hammond B3 organ, loops 
 Troy Lancaster – electric guitar 
 Greg Morrow – drums, percussion
 Gordon Mote – acoustic piano, Wurlitzer electric piano, Hammond B3 organ 
 Russ Pahl – lap steel guitar, pedal steel guitar

 Danny Parks – acoustic guitar, banjo 
 Ben Phillips – percussion 
 Jimmy Robbins – programming 
 Adam Shoenfeld – electric guitar 
 Jimmie Lee Sloas – bass
 Bryan Sutton – acoustic guitar, acoustic slide guitar, 12-string acoustic guitar
 Chris Tompkins – programming
 John Willis – banjo

Production

 
 Brady Barnett – digital editing
 Brandon Blackstock – management
 Narvel Blackstock – management 
 Drew Bollman – recording, recording assistant, mix assistant 
 Amanda Craig – grooming 
 Sally Carnes Gulde – design 
 Scott Hendricks – producer, overdub recording, digital editing 
 Charles Henry – landscape photography 
 Sandra Johnson – photography 
 Scott Johnson – production assistant 
 Joe Martino – overdub assistant 
 Justin Niebank – recording, mixing

 Allen Parker – recording assistant 
 Katherine Petillo – art direction
 Ben Phillips – digital editing 
 Shutterstock – landscape photography 
 Mike Stankiewicz – overdub assistant 
 Peter Strickland – brand management 
 Shane Tarleton – creative direction 
 Trish Townsend – wardrobe 
 Hank Williams – mastering 
 Brian David Willis – digital editing
 Brad Winters – overdub assistant 

Studios
 Recorded at Ocean Way (Nashville, Tennessee).
 Overdubbed at Ocean Way Recording, Sound Emporium, Cinema Sauna, Villahona Resort, Riverview Back Porch Studio and Warner Bros. Studio B.
 Mixed at Hound's Ear Studio (Franklin, Tennessee) and Blackbird Studio (Nashville, Tennessee).
 Mastered at MasterMix (Nashville, Tennessee).

Charts and certifications

Weekly charts

Year-end charts

Singles

Decade-end charts

Certifications

References

2013 albums 
Albums produced by Scott Hendricks
Blake Shelton albums
Warner Records albums